Elections to Liverpool Town Council were held on Thursday 1 November 1853. One third of the council seats were up for election, the term of office of each councillor being three years.

Eleven of the sixteen wards were uncontested.

After the election, the composition of the council was:

Election result

Ward results

* – Retiring Councillor seeking re-election

Abercromby

Castle Street

Everton

Exchange

Great George

Lime Street

North Toxteth

Pitt Street

Rodney Street

{{Election box candidate with party link|
  |party      = Conservative Party (UK)
  |candidate  = James Aspinall Tobin *
  |votes      = ''2  |percentage = unopposed  |change     = 
}}

St. Anne Street

St. Paul's

St. Peter's

Scotland

South Toxteth

Vauxhall

West Derby

Aldermanic Elections

On 9 November 1853, the term of office of eight aldermen who were elected on 9 November 1847 expired.

The following were elected as Aldermen by the council on 9 November 1853 for a term of office of six years.*''' – re-elected Alderman.

By Elections

No. 11, Abercromby, November 1853

Caused by Councillor Richard Cardwell Gardner (Conservative, elected 1 November 1853) being elected as an alderman on 9 November 1853.

No. 8, Pitt Street, November 1853

Caused by Councillor Thomas Toulmin (Conservative, elected 1 November 1852) being elected as an alderman on 9 November 1853.

No. 15, South Toxteth, November 1853

Caused by Councillor Samuel Holme (Conservative, elected 1 November 1853) being elected as an alderman on 9 November 1853.

See also
Liverpool Town Council elections 1835 – 1879
Liverpool City Council elections 1880–present
Mayors and Lord Mayors 
of Liverpool 1207 to present
History of local government in England

References

1853
1853 English local elections
November 1853 events
1850s in Liverpool